Las hermanas Gilda (Gilda sisters) are Spanish comic characters of the series of the same name created by Manuel Vázquez Gallego in 1949. The protagonists are the sisters Hermenegilda and Leovigilda, who live together. The names of the series and its characters refer to the movie Gilda, released three years earlier in Spain, and the deadly conflict between the visigoths rulers Hermenegild and Liuvigild who also were family (in this case, father and son).

Plot
Hermegilda and Leovigilda are two sisters of opposite characteristics Herme is brunette, plump, with her hair in a characteristic bun ; Leo is tall and slim, with blond hair. Both are unsightly. Hermenegilda is innocent and goofy, and relentlessly pursues a husband, while Leovigilda, more mature, is a skeptical and bitter character, always trying to thwart her little sister.

Leovigilda and Hermenegilda represent sexual frustration and repression of Spanish Francoist regime. The characters are in eternal conflict and there are plenty of slapstick style shots, as usual in the comics of Bruguera.

In 1955 censorship became tougher in the comics and the adult tone of the series dropped.

References

Bibliography 
 GUIRAL, Antoni (2010). By Vázquez: 80 años del nacimiento de un mito. Barcelona: Ediciones B. 
 MARTÍNEZ PEÑARANDA, Enrique (2004). Vázquez (El dibujante y su leyenda). Madrid: Ediciones Sinsentido, Colección Sin Palabras, Serie A nª 04. . Depósito legal: M-39015-2004.
 MOIX, Terenci (2007). Historia social del cómic. Barcelona: Ediciones B.  Depósito legal: B-2551-2007.

External links 
 Las hermanas Gilda part of series "El humor en el cómic" for "La Ciberniz" 
 Las hermanas Gilda, "Kioscopedia" 

1949 comics debuts
Spanish comics titles
Spanish comic strips
Comic strip duos
Fictional Spanish people
Humor comics
Comics characters introduced in 1949
Spanish comics characters
Comics about women
Female characters in comics